Dry is a surname. Notable people with the surname include:

Amity Dry (born 1978), Australian singer-songwriter
Avis M. Dry (1922–2007), British psychologist
Chris Dry (born 1988), South African rugby union player
Claud Dry, co-founder of Midget Motors Corporation
Corné Dry (born 1993), South African cricketer
F. A. Dry (born 1931), American football player coach
Francis Dry (1891–1979), New Zealand geneticist, biologist, university lecturer and wool researcher
Jodie Dry (born 1974), Australian actress
Mark Dry (born 1987), Scottish hammer thrower
Murray Dry, American political scientist
Richard Dry (1815–1869), Australian politician
Stuart Dry, Australian slalom canoeist
Tim Dry (born 1952), English actor

See also
Helen Aristar-Dry, American linguist